Hemipachnobia monochromatea, known generally as the sundew dart or sundew cutworm moth, is a species of cutworm or dart moth in the family Noctuidae.

The MONA or Hodges number for Hemipachnobia monochromatea is 10993.1.

References

Further reading

 
 
 

Noctuinae
Articles created by Qbugbot
Moths described in 1874